A land-parcel identification system (LPIS) is a system to identify land use for a given country. It utilises orthophotos – basically aerial photographs and high precision satellite images that are digitally rendered to extract as much meaningful spatial information as possible. A unique number is given to each land parcel to provide a unique identification in space and time. This information is then updated regularly to monitor the evolution of the land cover and the management of the crops.

Weblinks 
 Joint Research Centre: Agricultural monitoring

Land use